The 1962 Pennsylvania gubernatorial election was held on November 6. Republican Bill Scranton and Democrat Richardson Dilworth, each a member of a powerful political family, faced off in a bitter campaign.

Primary
Both endorsed candidates easily defeated their primary opposition. Dilworth faced only token candidates, led by McKees Rocks real estate agent Harvey Johnston. Scranton was challenged by Collins McSparran of Lancaster County. McSparran, who was the son of former gubernatorial candidate John McSparran, was the president of the state branch of The Grange, and had a small but vocal base in farming interests.

Major Party Candidates

Democratic
Richardson Dilworth, Mayor of Philadelphia
running mate: Stephen McCann, State Representative

Republican
Bill Scranton, US Congressman
running mate: Ray Shafer, State Senator

Campaign
After John F. Kennedy received a relatively large win in the state in 1960, combined with a poor showing in the previous year's municipal elections, Republicans attempted to cast themselves in a moderate light and thus chose the rising star Scranton, a so-called "Kennedy Republican" for his socially liberal viewpoints, as their nominee. Scranton, whose only prior elected position was a two-year term in Congress, was immediately attacked for his inexperience. However, Scranton's positions or credentials were rarely the focal point of the election; rather the race was seen as a referendum on Dilworth, a former nominee for this same office, who was serving as the controversial Mayor of Philadelphia.

Throughout his political career, Dilworth had gained a reputation for taking hard-nosed action and for not being afraid to speak his mind. During the campaign, he continuously waged direct assaults on state Republican leaders, asserting that Scranton was a tool of the faltering Republican machine (Dilworth first gained statewide fame for breaking Republican machine politics in Philadelphia in the late 1940s). He also raised the issue of a restrictive covenant that was in place on a Scranton-owned property in Florida, charging that the stipulation that the residence could only be sold to a Caucasian demonstrated that Scranton had racist sentiments; Scranton defended himself by asserting that the condition was placed in the lease by a previous owner and could not be removed, and he countered by criticizing Dilworth for his affiliation with several all-white, elite social clubs. Dilworth was also plagued by corruption charges and, during the course of his campaign, reversed his position from strongly opposing an investigation into city government, to endorsing it as a way to demonstrate a commitment to transparency.

On Election Day, Scranton took 62 of the state's 67 counties in an impressive win. Dilworth struggled not only in GOP strongholds, but also in the heavily Democratic Pittsburgh area, where he was plagued by both the corruption charges and anti-Philadelphian sentiment. His loss was especially heavy in Philadelphia's suburban counties, both because of his involvement in a controversial failed redistricting plan designed to divide upper class GOP support, as well as because of his antagonistic attitude toward suburbanites (he was quoted as saying "if a few of those Main Liners got mugged once in a while, it might teach them a way of life"). Dilworth also won by a smaller than expected margin in his home city, as his personality clash caused city Democratic leaders to give only tepid support.

Results

References

1962
Pennsylvania
Gubernatorial
November 1962 events in the United States